James Parker Jones (born July 3, 1940) is an American lawyer and jurist serving as a senior United States district judge of the United States District Court for the Western District of Virginia and a Judge of the United States Foreign Intelligence Surveillance Court. He served as a Judge of the United States Alien Terrorist Removal Court from 2016 to 2021.

Early life and education
Jones was born in Tampa, Florida. He received an Artium Baccalaureus degree in psychology from Duke University in 1962 and a Bachelor of Laws from the University of Virginia School of Law in 1965.

Career
Jones was an assistant commonwealth attorney general of Virginia from 1965 to 1966. He was a law clerk for Judge Clement Haynsworth of the United States Court of Appeals for the Fourth Circuit from 1966 to 1968. He was in private practice in Abingdon, Virginia from 1968 to 1971, and in Bristol, Virginia, from 1971 to 1995. He was a member of the Senate of Virginia from 1983 to 1988. He also served on the Virginia State Board of Education from 1990 to 1996.

Expired district court nomination under Jimmy Carter
On May 16, 1979, President Jimmy Carter nominated Jones to a seat on the United States District Court for the Western District of Virginia. However, the United States Senate did not process Jones' nomination before Carter lost his bid for re-election, and President Ronald Reagan chose not to renominate Jones to the seat.

Renomination under Clinton
Jones eventually became a judge on the United States District Court for the Western District of Virginia after President Bill Clinton nominated him on December 12, 1995, to fill the seat vacated by James Harry Michael Jr., who had taken senior status. The United States Senate confirmed Jones on July 18, 1996, and he received his commission on August 1, 1996. Jones served as Chief Judge from 2004 to 2010. He assumed senior status on August 30, 2021. He has served as a judge of the United States Foreign Intelligence Surveillance Court since 2015 and as a Judge of the United States Alien Terrorist Removal Court from 2016 to 2021.

Personal life 
Jones married Mary Duke Trent, the granddaughter of Mary Duke Biddle and Anthony Joseph Drexel Biddle Sr., in 1964. Trent died in 2012.

References

External links

1940 births
Living people
20th-century American judges
21st-century American judges
Duke University alumni
Judges of the United States District Court for the Western District of Virginia
Judges of the United States Foreign Intelligence Surveillance Court
People from Tampa, Florida
United States district court judges appointed by Bill Clinton
University of Virginia School of Law alumni
Virginia Democrats